The term City of God may refer to The City of God (De civitate Dei), a 5th-century book by St. Augustine of Hippo, and subsequently to the Roman Catholic Church and its unity with civil power, such as existed between the it and the Holy Roman Empire in the Middle Ages. 

There are many derivative works and institutions:

Places
Cidade de Deus (Osasco), the Banco Bradesco headquarters in Osasco, São Paulo, Brazil
Cidade de Deus, Rio de Janeiro, a neighborhood of Rio de Janeiro

Art, entertainment, and media

Literature
The City of God (De civitate Dei), a 5th-century book by St. Augustine of Hippo
City of God (Holland novel), a 1979 historical novel by Cecelia Holland
City of God (Lins novel) (Cidade de Deus), a 1997 novel by Paulo Lins set in the Rio de Janeiro neighborhood Cidade de Deus (City of God, in Portuguese)
City of God, a 2000 novel by E. L. Doctorow
Mystical City of God, a 17th-century book by María de Ágreda

Game
City of the Gods, a 1987 adventure module for the Dungeons & Dragons role-playing game

Film
City of God (2002 film) (Cidade de Deus), a 2002 Brazilian film based on Lins' novel
City of God – 10 Years Later, a 2012 Brazilian documentary about the 2002 film
City of God (2011 film), an Indian film

See also
Jerusalem, Israel, according to Psalm 46 in the Old Testament
New Jerusalem, a concept in the Abrahamic religions and Zionism
Rome, since the diocese of the city is known as the Holy see and the Pope is the bishop of Rome
Vatican City, a sovereign state and an enclave within Rome
 Theopolis or Antioch, an ancient city in what is now Turkey called "the cradle of Christianity"